Group B of the 1999 FIFA Confederations Cup took place from 24 to 30 July 1999 in Guadalajara's Estadio Jalisco. The group consisted of defending champion Brazil, Germany, New Zealand, and the United States.

Teams

Notes

Standings

In the semi-finals:
 The winners of Group B, Brazil, advanced to play the runners-up of Group A, Saudi Arabia.
 The runners-up of Group B, United States, advanced to play the winners of Group A, Mexico.

Results

Brazil vs Germany

New Zealand vs United States

Germany vs New Zealand

Brazil vs United States

United States vs Germany

New Zealand vs Brazil

References

B
Brazil at the 1999 FIFA Confederations Cup
1999 in New Zealand association football
1999 in American soccer
1999–2000 in German football